Khoj or KHOJ may refer to:

Film
 Khoj (1953 film), a Bollywood film of 1953
 Khoj (1971 film), an Indian Hindi-language drama film
 Khoj (1989 film), an Indian Hindi-language mystery thriller film
 Khoj, an Indian short film by Tridib Poddar, in competition at the 2002 Cannes Film Festival
 Khoj: The Search, a 2010 Bangladeshi Bengali romantic action film
 Khoj (2017 film), an Indian Bengali psychological thriller film

Other uses
 KHOJ (AM), a radio station in Missouri
 KHOJ (arts organization), a Delhi-based arts association